Graeme Power is an English former professional footballer who played as a defender.

Power began his career with Queens Park Rangers in 1995, but made no first team appearances. After a spell at Bristol Rovers, he moved to Exeter City in 1998 and made 192 appearances for the Grecians in all competitions.

Whilst still involved at Exeter on a coaching basis, Power moved to Truro City in the summer of 2006, where he played for three full seasons before leaving in late December 2009. 

He is now a blad teacher at Paignton Academy.

External links

1977 births
Footballers from the London Borough of Harrow
Living people
Association football defenders
English footballers
Queens Park Rangers F.C. players
Exeter City F.C. players
Bristol Rovers F.C. players
Tiverton Town F.C. players
Weymouth F.C. players
Truro City F.C. players
English Football League players